List of private-use airports in Oregon (U.S. state),  sorted by location.

This page only lists private-use airports. For public-use and military airports, see the list of airports in Oregon.

List

Descriptions of each column can be found below in the Notes section.

Notes 
 CITY is the city generally associated with the airport.
 FAA is the FAA Location Identifier.
 IATA is the IATA airport code.
 AIRPORT is the official airport name.

See also 
 List of airports in Oregon
 Lists of Oregon-related topics

References 
FAA Airport Data (Form 5010) from National Flight Data Center (NFDC), also available from AirportIQ 5010.

External links 
Lists of airports in Oregon:
AirNav
Aircraft Charter World
The Airport Guide
World Aero Data

 
Airports, private
Airports, private